is a Japanese actor from Tokyo. He graduated from Keio University's business school. He is known for his portrayal of Masato Kusaka/Kamen Rider Kaixa in Kamen Rider 555 and as Yuji Nakajo/Hikomaro/Giza/Hikaru in Cutie Honey: The Live. He also had a regular role as Kent Kiba/Dimensional Investigator Kent in Jikuu Keisatsu Wecker D-02. He also has a role as SpaMurasaki on Nippon Television's parodic Bihada Sentai Sparanger which looks at various onsen throughout Japan. Not to be confused with the Kohei Murakami who played Yamada Hanatarou in the Rock Musical Bleach series.

Filmography

Television

Anime

Film

Video games

References

External links
KoheiMurakami.com  - Official website

1976 births
Male actors from Tokyo
Keio University alumni
Living people
Kamen Rider
Japanese male film actors
Japanese television actors
20th-century Japanese male actors
21st-century Japanese male actors